Sampler may refer to:
 Sampler (signal), a digital signal processing device that converts a continuous signal to a discrete signal
 Sampler (needlework), a handstitched piece of embroidery used to demonstrate skill in needlework
 Sampler (surname)
 A quilt where each block is constructed using a different pattern
 Sampler, or hydrocarbon well logging, or mud logger
 In sampling (medicine), the instrument used

Music
 Sampler (musical instrument), a device used to create digital recordings called samples
 Sampler (Cardiacs album), 1995 
 Sampler (Cat Empire EP)
 Sampler (Plumb EP)
 Sampler album, a type of compilation album
 In Store Jam, a promotional compilation by Jamiroquai

See also
 Sample (disambiguation)
 Sampling (disambiguation)